"I'd Like to Have That One Back" is a song recorded by American country music artist George Strait.  It was released in November 1993 as the second single from his album Easy Come Easy Go.  The song reached number 3 on the Billboard Hot Country Singles & Tracks chart in February 1994. It was written by Aaron Barker, Bill Shore and Rick West.

Chart performance
"I'd Like to Have That One Back" debuted on the U.S. Billboard Hot Country Singles & Tracks for the week of December 4, 1993.

Year-end charts

References

1993 singles
1993 songs
George Strait songs
Song recordings produced by Tony Brown (record producer)
Songs written by Aaron Barker
MCA Records singles
Songs written by Bill Shore